Rural Plains, also informally known as Shelton House, is a historic farm house dating to the 1660s in Mechanicsville, Virginia, Hanover County; it is one of the sites included within the Richmond National Battlefield Park. The building was added to the National Register of Historic Places in 1975.

History 
John Shelton built Rural Plains in 1670. A subsequent John Shelton, the tavern keeper at Hanover Court House, was the father of Sarah Shelton, who married the statesman Patrick Henry in 1754. Shelton family, as well as popular, lore state that this marriage took place in the house's first floor parlor, though evidence cannot confirm this claim. Sarah's father gave Henry and her a wedding present of 300 acres of the Rural Plains property, which became known as Pine Slash. Their original residence at Pine Slash was destroyed by a fire in 1757; they then moved into the overseer's house today. This building, referred to as the "Honeymoon Cottage" still stands today a mile away from the Shelton House.

During the Battle of Totopotomoy Creek (the house stands 0.4 miles away from Totopotomoy Creek ) on May 30, 1864, the house suffered severe damage from artillery fire. Union signalmen climbed atop the house to convey messages to their troops. Confederate cannoneers tried to shoot them down, striking the building 51 times, but the signalmen survived. The scars of the damage remain today, but the Sheltons, who had sheltered in the basement during the battle, continued to reside in the house.

The house was continuously inhabited by nine generations of Sheltons until the property was transferred to become part of Richmond National Battlefield Park in 2006. The Park owns 124 acres and manages the site in cooperation with the private Rural Plains Foundation, which was established in 2013.

Architecture 
It was initially popularly assumed that the house was built around the same time as the property was acquired, but various architectural features, including brickwork, window size and the original gambrel roof suggested a style which was not used in Virginia until several decades later. The double-pile house is divided by a central passage and the front rooms are deeper than the back rooms. Each room contains a corner fireplace.

Many features which were in the house when first deeded to the National Park Service were not original. Much of the woodwork has been replaced. The rear front porch was relatively recently built. Additional windows have been installed. The single largest change in the house came during a major remodeling since construction; the high quality Greek Revival trim, doors, and windows from this remodel suggest that this remodeling took place in the second quarter of the nineteenth century. Since the property was obtained by Richmond National Battlefield Park, there have been continuous efforts to identify the original architectural features of the Shelton House and restore it to its original condition.

Gallery

See also
List of the oldest buildings in Virginia

References

External links

Rural Plains, 7273 Studley Road (State Route 606), Mechanicsville, Hanover County, VA: 3 photos and 6 data pages at Historic American Buildings Survey
Descriptive website

Houses on the National Register of Historic Places in Virginia
Houses completed in 1723
National Register of Historic Places in Hanover County, Virginia
Houses in Hanover County, Virginia
Richmond National Battlefield Park
Historic American Buildings Survey in Virginia
1723 establishments in the Thirteen Colonies